Markus Krösche (born 17 September 1980) is a German football coach and former player. The Bundesliga RB Leipzig club appointed him to be their sporting director on 1 July 2019. He filled a vacancy opened by the departure of Ralf Rangnick and in 2021, Markus Krösche become the sporting director of Eintracht Frankfurt. 

In April 2021, Krösche announced his departure from Leipzig to Eintracht Frankfurt .

Career as a player
Markus Krösche, who won the German A youth championship as team captain in 1999 with Werder Bremen, switched to the 2001/02 season from Bremen's amateurs to regional league rivals SC Paderborn 07, with whom he finished second in the 2004/05 season, equal on points with champions Eintracht Braunschweig, managed to get promoted from the Regionalliga Nord to the 2nd Bundesliga. In 2008, as the longest-serving player, he extended his contract with SCP by a further four years until 2012. He took over the position of team captain from René Müller after he left the club after Paderborn was relegated to the 3rd division. In the 2008/09 season, Krösche made an immediate return to the 2nd Bundesliga with Paderborn. After extending his contract again in 2011, Krösche ended his career as a professional soccer player in the summer of 2014. In his last season, Paderborn was promoted to the Bundesliga for the first time in 2013/14, to which he contributed with 18 appearances and two goals.

Krösche played 192 times for SC Paderborn in the 2nd Bundesliga and 162 times in the third divisions. This makes him the record player of SCP 07 and its predecessor clubs in professional football.

In 2007, Krösche was elected to the SC Paderborn 07's eleven of the century.

References

External links
 
 
 Markus Krosche Interview

1980 births
Living people
Footballers from Hanover
German footballers
Association football defenders
Germany under-21 international footballers
2. Bundesliga players
3. Liga players
SV Werder Bremen II players
SC Paderborn 07 players